The 1995 du Maurier Classic was contested from August 24–27 at Beaconsfield Golf Club. It was the 23rd edition of the du Maurier Classic, and the 17th edition as a major championship on the LPGA Tour.

This event was won by Jenny Lidback.

Final leaderboard

External links
 Golf Observer source

Canadian Women's Open
du Maurier Classic
du Maurier Classic
du Maurier Classic
du Maurier Classic